Channel 16 (in reference to 16 December) was a Bangladeshi Bengali-language satellite and cable music oriented television channel, owned and operated by Insight Telecast. The channel was permitted to broadcast via a Singaporean satellite and officially began broadcasting on 16 December 2011. 

It was the first and the sole music channel in Bangladesh until the launch of Gaan Bangla in 2013. Channel 16's managing director was K G Muhit, who had requested the government to let him run a downlinked privately owned satellite television channel in 2008.

Despite only being allowed to broadcast from abroad, Channel 16 illegally broadcast from Dhaka, and even via the Israel-based RRsat satellite. After its license for test broadcasting had expired on 30 November 2013, which had not been renewed ever since, the Bangladesh Telecommunication Regulatory Commission obliged Channel 16 to cease all transmissions by 2 December 2014. 

However, by that point, it illegally continued broadcasting by ceasing to identify itself as Channel 16 and began using the letter 'k' as its on-screen bug, and later began identifying itself as 'MB', or sometimes 'Movie Bangla', along with its on-screen bug involving a clock. It had also been accused of broadcasting while evading revenue to the government.

References

Television channels in Bangladesh
Television channels and stations established in 2011
Television channels and stations disestablished in 2014
Defunct television channels in Bangladesh